The boteh, is an almond or pine cone-shaped motif in ornament with a sharp-curved upper end. Though of Persian origin, it is very common and called buta in India, Azerbaijan, Turkey and other countries of the Near East.  Via Kashmir shawls it spread to Europe at least in 19th century, where patterns using it are known since 1960s as paisleys, as Paisley, Renfrewshire in Scotland was a major centre making them.

In Asian ornament the boteh motifs are typically placed in orderly rows, though especially in India they may appear in a pattern in a variety of sizes, colours, and orientations, which is also characteristic of European paisley patterns.

Some design scholars believe the boteh is the convergence of a stylized floral spray and a cypress tree: a Zoroastrian symbol of life and eternity. The "bent" cedar is also a sign of strength and resistance but modesty. The floral motif was originated in the Sassanid dynasty and later in the Safavid dynasty of Persia (1501–1736), and was a major textile pattern in Iran during the Qajar and Pahlavi dynasties. In these periods, the pattern was used to decorate royal regalia, crowns, and court garments, as well as textiles used by the general population.  Persian and Central Asian designs usually range the motifs in orderly rows, with a plain background.

Uses
The motifs can still be found on Persian carpets, Azerbaijani rugs, kalaghai shawls and textiles, paintings of decorative-applied arts of Greater Iran and also in decorations of architectural monuments.

It is woven using gold or silver threads on silk or other high quality textiles for gifts, for weddings and special occasions. In Iran and Uzbekistan, its use goes beyond clothing, with paintings, jewelry, frescoes, curtains, tablecloths, quilts, carpets, garden landscaping, and pottery also sporting the boteh design. In Uzbekistan the most frequently found item featuring the design is the traditional doʻppi caps.

In Tamil Nadu the manga maalai (mango necklace) with matching earrings is a traditional feature of bharathanatyam dance.
It is a prominent design in Kanchipuram saris. It has sometimes been associated with Hinduism.

Patterns and ornaments of buta motifs can be found on Azerbaijani rugs, kalaghai and textiles, paintings of decorative-applied arts of Azerbaijan and also in decorations of architectural monuments. This motif is considered as the most ancient among all national ornaments of Azerbaijan. There are many printed items decorated only with buta.  
Buta is displayed in the emblem of the 2012 FIFA U-17 Women's World Cup, which was held in Azerbaijan. It is also the mascot of Buta Airways.

Gallery

References

Sources

 F. Petri «Origin of the Book of the Dead Angient Egipt». 1926. June part 2 с 41-45
 С. Ашурбейли «Новые изыскания по истории Баку и Девичьей башни» Альманах искусств 1972 г, С.Ашурбейли «О датировке и назначении Гыз галасы в крепости» Элм. 1974 г.

Ornaments
Arts in Azerbaijan
Persian words and phrases